Toni Schreier (born 7 March 1962) is a retired German football midfielder.

References

External links
 

1962 births
Living people
German footballers
Bundesliga players
VfL Bochum players
Association football midfielders